This is a listing of the horses that finished in either first, second, or third place and the number of starters in the What A Summer Stakes (1978–2010), an American Thoroughbred Stakes race for fillies and mares four years-old and up at six furlongs run on dirt at Laurel Park Racecourse in Laurel, Maryland.

References

External links
 Laurel Park website

Laurel Park Racecourse